Pedro Ruiz (born 17 August 1947) is a Spanish radio presenter, actor, screenwriter and comedian.

Radio 
As an RJ, Pedro has anchored various programmes.

Television 
In 1972, Pedro Ruiz started his television career at Televisión Española by presenting the show Estudio Estadio. In 1974, he appeared in the show ¿Le conoce usted? telecast on TVE. He remained one of the most popular presenters in Spain from the 1970s to the 1990s.

Awards and nominations 
 Nominated, Goya Award for Best Supporting Actor (1987) for Moros y Cristianos.
 Won, TP d'Oru (1986) Most Popular Person forComo Pedro por su casa.

Filmography
"The Bigger, the Better" (2017) as Padre Santiago
"Oh, quina joia!" (2016) as Jimmy
"¿Qué fue de Jorge Sanz?" (TV Series 2016)as Pedro Ruiz
"Academia de baile Gloria" (TV Series 2001)
"Proceso a ETA" (1989)
"La claror daurada" (TV Series 1989)
"Moors and Christians" (1987) as Pepe
"Policía" (1987) as Vigilante estadio (uncredited)
"El gran mogollón" (1982)
"Volver a empezar (1982) as Juan Carlos I (voice)
"El día del presidente (1979) as President

References

External links

Living people
Male actors from Barcelona
Spanish male film actors
Spanish television presenters
Spanish radio presenters
1947 births